Serhii Sternenko (born 20 March 1995) is a Ukrainian far-right nationalist, social activist, lawyer, and YouTuber. As of 2023, his YouTube channel has over 1.5 million subscribers. He is the head of the non-government organization Nebayduzhi, one of the founders of the People's Lustration, and a former board member and head of the Odesa regional branch of the far right umbrella group Right Sector. He was an active participant in the Revolution of Dignity, including the 2014 Odesa clashes. 

Sternenko was the target of three assassination attempts. In 2018, he became visible in the media after the third attempt. It is believed that the "manhunt" was organized by supporters of pro-Russian groups and their sympathizers. During the incident, one of the two attackers died and the second fled abroad. As a result, Sternenko has been accused of exceeding the limits of self-defence. The police formally charged him with premeditated murder and possession of weapons without permit. However, Andrii Radionov, the senior prosecutor in the case, refused to sign the charges, claiming that the case and the evidence in the case are biased and do not comply with the legislation of Ukraine.

The case against Sternenko received considerable media attention and prompted hundreds of activists to gather near the court building in support of Sternenko. Hundreds of security officers were called upon to restrain the people.

Biography

Serhii's father is a former border guard, his mother is a teacher. In 2019 he graduated from the Odesa University with a jurisprudence diploma.

Sternenko was an active participant in the 2014 Ukrainian revolution and is one of the founders of the Lustration in Ukraine, a civil activist and lawyer, the head of the non-government organization Nebayduzhi and a former board member and head of the Odesa regional branch of the Right Sector.

In 2015, Sternenko's house in Odesa was searched. The activist voluntarily handed to law enforcement officials his air gun, a collectible knife, and a noise pistol. Serhii Shcherbych had accused Sternenko of his alleged abduction, alleging that Sternenko wanted to steal UAH 300 (about US$11). Sternenko denied ever having met Shcherbych; according to court proceedings other members of Right Sector did. Shcherbych was a deputy of the Lyman Raion Council for the pro-Russian Rodina party who was accused of organising so-called titushky (criminal gangs hired to beat up anti-government protesters).

On 9 October 2019, the General Prosecutor's Office of Ukraine sent a criminal case involving attacks on civil activist Serhii Sternenko in Odesa to the Main Investigation Directorate of the SBU to check the information about the possible involvement of local authorities and police of the Odesa city. Earlier in 2018, the Odesa police launched criminal proceedings under Part 1, Article 15, Part 1, Article 115 (attempted murder) of the Criminal Code of Ukraine due to an assassination attempt on activist Serhii Sternenko. The attack on Sternenko took place right next to his place of residence in Odesa during night time hours. The Sternenko's assailants were not residents of Odesa. During 2018 there were at least three attacks on Sternenko, one of which led to death of one of the attackers. Following the death, one of the former attackers accused Sternenko of planned assassination against them. As witnessed by Isaikul himself, Sternenko attacked him and Kuznetsov while holding hands with his girlfriend and carrying groceries. The attack on Sternenko was one of several repressions against activists and journalists such as Kateryna Handziuk in 2018 throughout South Ukraine and Odesa in particular.

A week after her appointment on 25 March 2020, the new Prosecutor General of Ukraine Iryna Venediktova held a formal meeting with the Minister of Internal Affairs Arsen Avakov to discuss the case about attack on Sternenko, but called it as the notorious case about murder of Ivan Kuznetsov. At the time of that meeting the case was under investigation in the Security Service of Ukraine.

The senior prosecutor of the case, Andrii Radionov, refused to sign the suspicion in the court case involving the attack on Sternenko. He claimed that the case and the evidence in the case were biased and did not comply with the legislation of Ukraine. The case became resonant, and thus, on 12 June 2020, hundreds of activists gathered near the court walls in defense of Sternenko, while hundreds of security officers were called up on to restrain the people.

On 23 February 2021 a court in Odesa found Sternenko and Ruslan Demchuk guilty of the abduction of Serhii Shcherbych and the illegal possession of arms. Sternenko was sentenced to seven years and three months in prison and half of his property was confiscated. That same evening,initially 500 but eventually 2,000 people protested near the Office of the President of Ukraine against his imprisonment. Seventeen protesters were detained amid clashes with police. On 31 May 2021 The Odesa Court of Appeals partially reversed the verdict in this case against Sternenko and Demchuk. The kidnapping sentence was the only part of the sentence not overturned, but they were released from punishment due to the expiration of the term of prosecution. The Court of Appeal ruled that the prosecution had not provided sufficient evidence that Shcherbych was robbed.

Video blog
Sternenko runs his own video blog on YouTube, where he talks about events in Ukraine. It won a Palianytsia Award for Man of the Year in Ukrainian YouTube from the editorial office of Toronto Television.

Honors
 On October 4, 2016, he was awarded the Medal "For Sacrifice and Love for Ukraine" by the Ukrainian Orthodox Church of the Kyiv Patriarchate

References

External links 

 STERNENKO YouTube Channel
 Tatiana Katrichenko. Defense reflex. How the Serhii Sternenko case became political (Захисний рефлекс. Як справа Сергія Стерненка стала політичною). Focus.ua. 16 June 2020.

1995 births
People from Odesa Oblast
Ukrainian human rights activists
Ukrainian nationalists
Ukrainian victims of crime
Living people
People convicted of kidnapping
People convicted of robbery